Portrait is a Canadian musical variety television series which aired on CBC Television in 1965.

Premise
Portrait was a spin-off from segments of the local A La Carte series on CBLT Toronto. Musicians featured during the series included Lucio Agostini, Ed Bickert and  Maurice Bolyer. One episode, "The Conformists", was a comedic work starring various performers such as Paul Soles.

Scheduling
This half-hour series was broadcast on Thursdays at 8:30 p.m. (Eastern) from 8 July to 9 September 1965.

References

External links
 
 

CBC Television original programming
1965 Canadian television series debuts
1965 Canadian television series endings